Malino is an urban locality (an urban-type settlement) in Stupinsky District of Moscow Oblast, Russia. Population:  It is the site of Malino Airfield.

References

Urban-type settlements in Moscow Oblast
Populated places in Stupinsky District